Mamasapano, officially the Municipality of Mamasapano (Maguindanaon: Ingud nu Mamasapano; Iranun: Inged a Mamasapano), is a 5th class municipality in the province of Maguindanao del Sur, Philippines. According to the 2020 census, it has a population of 27,807 people.

History
This municipality before was only a mere barangay of the town of Shariff Aguak. However, by virtue of Republic Acts No. 6646/7160 and Muslim Mindanao Autonomy Act No. 54 dated April 27, 1997, issued on December 2, 1998, COMELEC Resolution No. 3051/3052 and Plebiscite conducted on October 31, 1998, the Municipality of Mamasapano then became the 11th municipality in the 2nd District of Maguindanao. The newly created municipality has eighteen (18) barangays taken from its mother Municipality of Shariff Aguak.

On July 30, 2009, upon the ratification of Muslim Mindanao Autonomy Act No. 225 (as amended by MMAA 252), the municipality of Shariff Saydona Mustapha was created from 4 barangays and a portion of one barangay (Libutan East) from Mamasapano, in addition to other barangays from Datu Piang, Datu Unsay, Datu Saudi-Ampatuan and Shariff Aguak.

Mamasapano clash

On Sunday January 25, 2015, the area around Mamasapano was the site of a sharp clash between Philippines government armed forces and local rebel groups.  In the fighting, 44 members of the Philippine National Police elite Special Action Force (SAF) were killed. The Moro Islamic Liberation Front (MILF) led by Necesio Jamisola Jr., later reported that 18 people had died on the rebel side.  Some local civilians were also killed during the incident. The unexpected clash, and the deaths of 44 SAF police as well as the wounding of 12 others, triggered bitter recriminations amongst leaders at the national level and threatened to derail on-going reconciliation negotiations between the Philippines Government and various rebel groups in Mindanao. It was reported that members of both the MILF as well as the Bangsamoro Islamic Freedom Fighters (BIFF) were involved in the action on the rebel side.  In response to the clash and deaths of national police, President Aquino called for the peace talks with MILF to nevertheless continue but also demanded that MILF forces assist in identifying the persons responsible for killing the police and, in other ways, demonstrate sincerity in supporting the peace efforts.

Subsequently, it was reported that both the Philippines government and local MILF representatives were working to try to restore life to normal in the Mamasapano area.  Representatives of the Philippines government visited the area in early February to deliver assistance to families who had lost relatives during the fighting.  Representatives of the MILF also issued assurances that on-going efforts to establish peace in the region would not be disrupted by the clash.  Nevertheless, in the following weeks local fighting continued between government forces and the BIFF rebel group.  In early March government forces were reported to have captured a BIFF camp where bombs and weapons were being manufactured.

Geography

Barangays
Mamasapano is politically subdivided into 15 barangays.
 Bagumbong
 Dabenayan
 Daladap
 Dasikil
 Liab
 Libutan
 Lusay
 Mamasapano
 Manongkaling
 Matias
 Pidsandawan
 Pimbalakan
 Sapakan
 Tuka
 Tukanalipao

Climate

Demographics

Economy

References

External links
 Mamasapano Profile at the DTI Cities and Municipalities Competitive Index
 MMA Act No. 54 : An Act creating the Municipality of Mamasapano in the Province of Maguindanao
 [ Philippine Standard Geographic Code]
 Local Governance Performance Management System

Municipalities of Maguindanao del Sur